Bounded Type may refer to:

 Bounded type (computer science)
  Bounded type (mathematics)